The Gymnasium Arnoldinum is a grammar school in Steinfurt, North Rhine-Westphalia, Germany.

References

Schools in North Rhine-Westphalia
Educational institutions established in 1853
1853 establishments in Germany
Buildings and structures in Steinfurt (district)